Gorazd Hiti (born August 12, 1948 in Jesenice, Yugoslavia) is a retired Slovenian professional ice hockey player.

Career

Club career
Hiti began his career with HK Kranjska Gora in the Yugoslav Ice Hockey League in 1963. In 1968, he signed with HK Acroni Jesenice, before moving to HK Olimpija Ljubljana in 1971. He played with HC Bolzano in Italy from 1976-1978. Hiti then retired, before returning to play with Olimpija Ljubljana again in 1983. Hiti ended his career with AS Renon in 1987.

International career
He represented the Yugoslavia national ice hockey team, and played in 191 matches, scoring 94 goals. Hiti participated in 14 World Championships, and the Winter Olympics in 1972, 1976, and 1984.

Coaching career
Hiti coached the HK MK Bled junior team, and the Slovenia men's national junior ice hockey team between 1996 and 2004.

Awards
1974 - Top scorer at the IIHF World Championships Group B.

References

External links

1948 births
Living people
HDD Olimpija Ljubljana players
HK Acroni Jesenice players
Ice hockey players at the 1972 Winter Olympics
Ice hockey players at the 1976 Winter Olympics
Ice hockey players at the 1984 Winter Olympics
Olympic ice hockey players of Yugoslavia
Sportspeople from Jesenice, Jesenice
Slovenian ice hockey coaches
Slovenian ice hockey right wingers
Yugoslav ice hockey right wingers
Expatriate ice hockey players in Italy
Yugoslav expatriate sportspeople in Italy
Yugoslav expatriate ice hockey people